Potatoes and Dragons is an animated series produced by Alphanim, Cinar, Canal J, France 3 and Europool. It was formerly broadcast in the United States until late September 2010 on This TV.

Characters 

King Hugo III - King Hugo III is the king of the land of the potatoes. He is easily upset, stubborn and hates the local dragon or anyone standing in his way or stopping things from going his way, he's almost not in a good mood mostly because Dragon gives him a hard time with all his flaming whenever they meet, or if Hugo teases him and messes with his things, even when Hugo is minding his own business, and does absolutely nothing, Dragon would still flame him anyway whether he likes/deserves it or not, he mistreats everyone bossing them around so much which makes him mad, he's always getting mad at Harry and giving him a hard time whenever he fails and not do his jobs right. Voiced by Danny Wells

Harry - Harry is King Hugo's torturer and right hand henchman. He tends to be absentminded and often does most of his worker's dirty work.

Knights - In every episode a new knight (or lady knight for girls) that ranged from a warrior to a scientist, appears and swears to slay or snare the dragon or make it domestic in some way, generally, in return for the hand of Melody the Princess or other forms of reward. They usually end up fighting against Hugo or being chased out of the kingdom.

Melody - Melody, the blonde-haired princess, loves the dragon, and if anything happens to him, her love with Riri will end, so she thwarts plans to kill the dragon. Almost all knights offer to marry her, in which she either falls into a trance of joy or acts disgusted. She wears a pink gown and a crown that is smoother than the King Hugo's, Dragon has never flamed her not even once, because they're friends. Voiced by Carrie Finlay

Riri - Riri, the hero of the series, is the court jester, who loves Melody and thwarts plans to kill Dragon, he often teases Juju which makes him mad sometimes, Dragon has once flamed him by accident except he wasn't aiming for him, he was trying to aim for King Hugo and the knight.  Voiced by Mark Hauser

Juju - Juju is a child living in the castle who helps Riri, but is easily upset and moody, he likes pulling pranks and making fun of King Hugo just for fun, he's good friends with Dragon who he always tries helping, he teams up with Melody and Riri saving Dragon's life and avoiding King Hugo's ideas on kicking him out, Dragon has once flamed him by accident and got mad at him for ruining his favorite ball, but after while, he forgives him and they both become friends again, he knows Dragon didn't mean to hurt his feelings from before, because it happens. Voiced by Annie Bovaird

Dragon - Dragon lives peacefully in the kingdom, but because he has a hatred of crowns finds himself uncontrollably willing to flame breathe Hugo into a pile of living ashes every time they meet, even when King Hugo is minding his own business, Dragon still has the plan to flame him anyway no matter what, even for nothing, whether he likes/deserves it or not, he can't talk, his voice is only heard when he's sighing, laughing, crying, yelling, screaming, and humming, his breath is always stinky whenever he spreads it around and flames someone, he would even sometimes be stinky himself. He often sometimes has a crush on a lady dragon almost known as his girlfriend, but he most likely loves being alone, he's good friends with Melody, Juju, and Riri whom he would never flame to ashes except maybe by accident, because they're all best friends and they try helping him whenever King Hugo has a plan of getting rid of him, he can even flame through pictures, ice, and the phone. Voiced by Mark Camacho

Merlin - Merlin is the king's loyal practitioner of magic. This wizard's spells and potions usually don't work and they end up exploding in Hugo's face. Merlin frequently helps the princess, Riri and Juju to help save the dragon. Voiced by John Vamvas

Roger the Talking Carrot - Roger is a carrot that advises the knight on how to defeat the dragon. He has no other use to the story other than revealing the dragon's weaknesses, and perhaps a tasty snack if he upsets the knight. Voiced by John Locke

Episodes

Plot
The show generally begins with a new knight coming in to defeat the dragon, and after an amusing "battle" leaving either scared, running or happy.

References

External links
 
 

2000s French animated television series
2000s Canadian animated television series
English-language television shows
French-language television shows
Canadian children's animated fantasy television series
French children's animated fantasy television series
Television series by Cookie Jar Entertainment
Television series by DHX Media
Teletoon original programming
2004 Canadian television series debuts
2004 Canadian television series endings
Television series created by Jan Van Rijsselberge